Dirk "Dick" Dolman (2 July 1935 – 23 January 2019) was a Dutch politician. In 1970, he became a member of the House of Representatives as a member of the Labour Party (PvdA). From 17 July 1979 to 14 September 1989 he was the Speaker of the House of Representatives.

Biography 
Dolman was born in Empe, Netherlands. In 1951, he was invited to attend Camp Rising Sun, a tuition-free international camp in Red Hook, New York. He joined the Labour Party in 1954.

He worked at the Ministry of Social Affairs and Health from 1963 to 1966. and at the ministry of Economic Affairs from 1966 until the middle of 1970, when he became a member of the House of Representatives, where his initial work was with health issues. In 1973, he became the finance spokesman for his faction. In 1979, he became the Speaker of the House of Representatives, succeeding Anne Vondeling. Dolman took an independent approach, which garnered him great authority from all the parties. Although the PvdA was not the largest party in the 1981 and 1986 elections, he was nevertheless re-elected as president. In 1989, he was defeated 75 to 68 by the emergence of Christian Democratic Appeal politician Wim Deetman. On 1 July 1990, less than a year later, Dolman left the House of Representatives to become a member of the Council of State.

Trivia
 In 1981, Dolman asked cabinet member Til Gardeniers in writing, if the "original was true, that the minister wanted to distribute fines" following possible surreptitious advertising made by the television comedy duo, Van Kooten en De Bie in their alter egos, Jacobse and Van Es. Dolman signed his question with their fictional Tegenpartij.
 There was an interview with Dolman in the first issue of Playboy in 1983.

References 

Dr. D. (Dick) Dolman at www.parlement.com.

1935 births
2019 deaths
Camp Rising Sun alumni
Labour Party (Netherlands) politicians
People from Brummen
Speakers of the House of Representatives (Netherlands)
University of Amsterdam alumni
Commanders of the Order of the Netherlands Lion